Vice Admiral Sir Barry Nigel Wilson  (5 June 1936 – 29 August 2018) was a senior Royal Navy officer.

Naval career
Educated at St Edward's School, Oxford and Britannia Royal Naval College, Wilson became commanding officer of the frigate HMS Mohawk in 1973 before becoming the first captain of the destroyer  in 1978. He went on to be Director of Navy Plans in 1983, Flag Officer Sea Training in 1985 and Assistant Chief of Defence Staff (Programmes) in 1987. His last appointment was as Deputy Chief of the Defence Staff (Programmes and Personnel) in 1989 before retiring in 1992.

In retirement he became chairman of SSAFA Forces Help.

He died on 29 August 2018 at the age of 82.

Family
In 1961 he married Elizabeth Ann Hardy; they had one son and one daughter.

References

|-

1936 births
2018 deaths
HMS Cardiff (D108)
Knights Commander of the Order of the Bath
Royal Navy vice admirals
People educated at St Edward's School, Oxford